The Roman Catholic Diocese of Chingleput is a diocese located in the city of Chingleput in the Ecclesiastical province of Madras and Mylapore in India.

History
 July 19, 2002: Established as the Diocese of Chingleput from the Metropolitan Archdiocese of Madras and Mylapore

Leadership
 Bishops of Chingleput (Latin Rite)
 Bishop Anthonisamy Neethinathan (July 19, 2002 – present)

Parishes and churches

The parish of Urapakkam includes St. Antony's Church, which is located on Church Road, Urapakkam.

See also
Chingleput District (Madras Presidency)

References

External links
 GCatholic.org 
 Catholic Hierarchy 

Roman Catholic dioceses in India
Christian organizations established in 2002
Roman Catholic dioceses and prelatures established in the 21st century
2002 establishments in Tamil Nadu
Christianity in Tamil Nadu